Severo-Evensk Airport  is an airport serving and located  northwest of Evensk in Severo-Evensky District, Magadan Oblast, Russia. It is a small engineered airfield with concrete parking area. It handles small transport aircraft.

Airlines and destinations

References

Airports built in the Soviet Union
Airports in Magadan Oblast